Robert Curtis is a British actor. He is best known for his role as Scratch in the Doctor Who Christmas special The Husbands of River Song (2015), Aaron in EastEnders (2012) and Lieutenant Barnes in Outlander. Curtis trained at The Royal Central School of Speech and Drama.

Career

Television

 Doctor Who
 Doctors
 EastEnders
 The Sarah Jane Adventures
 Outlander

Film

 The Rendlesham UFO Incident (released in the U.S as Hangar 10) (2014)
 Hamlet (2009)

Theatre

 For the Royal Shakespeare Company 2008 season: A Midsummer Night's Dream; Love's Labours Lost; Hamlet
 Harry Potter and the Cursed Child in London

Other theatre credits include

Love Me Do
 Joking Apart
 The Butterfly Lion
 The Blue Room
 The Madness of King George III
 Romeo & Juliet
 The Comedy of Errors 
 A Midsummer Night's Dream
 Sweethearts
 The Importance of Being Earnest

References

External links
 

Living people
British male film actors
British male stage actors
British male television actors
Year of birth missing (living people)